The Mother is a novel by Pearl S. Buck published in 1934. It features an unnamed peasant woman in rural, pre-revolutionary China.

External links
 
 

1934 American novels
Novels by Pearl S. Buck
American novels adapted into films
John Day Company books